Pamela Ann Davy (7 September 1933 – 3 June 2018) was an Australian actress, best known for her roles on British television during the 1960s. After graduating from RADA in 1960, and after early repertory experience, she appeared in many popular TV shows of the day. She married racing car driver Geoffrey Lyndon Archer in 1971, and lived latterly in suburban Hobart, Tasmania, Australia until her death on 3 June 2018, aged 84.

Selected filmography

Television
 Doctor Who (in the serial The Power of the Daleks)
 The Avengers (in the Episodes "Mission to Montreal" & "The Living Dead")
 No Hiding Place
 The Saint
 Department S
 Freewheelers
 The First Churchills

Film 
 More Deadly than the Male (1959)
 Change Partners (Edgar Wallace Mysteries 1965) -Jean
 Be My Guest (1965) (Credited as Pamela Ann Davies)
 Amsterdam Affair (1968)

References

External links
 

Place of birth missing
1933 births
2018 deaths
Australian television actresses
Alumni of RADA